Pachnephorus bracarumvestitus is a species of leaf beetle found in the Democratic Republic of the Congo, described by Stefano Zoia in 2007. Its name is a compound of the Latin bracarum ("of trousers") and vestitus ("dressed"), referring to the wide scales covering the legs of the species.

References

Eumolpinae
Beetles of the Democratic Republic of the Congo
Beetles described in 2007
Endemic fauna of the Democratic Republic of the Congo